Captain Thomas Lipson (ca.1784 – 25 October 1863) was an officer in the Royal Navy, who, after a successful if unspectacular career in the Royal Navy, was appointed by the Admiralty as the first Harbour Master at South Australia, arriving there with the pioneer settlers. Serving from 1836 to 1855, based at Port Adelaide, Lipson also superintended many of the initial maritime surveys of that new colony.

He was born in Dartmouth, England. In 1793, at the age of 9 or 10, joined the Royal Navy as a first-class volunteer on  under Captain Sir Thomas Byard.

Career
 In 1798, in  under Byard at the Battle of Tory Island.
 In 1803, he joined  and assisted at the blockade of the enemy's ports from Brest to the Dardanelles. He was present on 22 August 1805, in Admiral Cornwallis's attack on the French fleet close to Brest harbour, when Montagu engaged with L'Alexandre (described in the reference as a ship of 80 guns).
Captain Lipson was awarded a medal and two clasps for general actions during the war.
In January 1817 he was in charge of the revenue cutter Lapwing, when she parted from her cables and was driven from her anchorage in Mill Bay, Plymouth, and went ashore high and dry over a ridge of rocks "with comparatively but little damage". He was in command of the Lapwing on 11 May 1818 when 17 casks of contraband spirits were seized. 
Lapwing (built 1808 in Mevagissey, Cornwall) was to turn up later in South Australia - she was brought to Port Adelaide in May 1850 and sold to merchant Ephraim Teakle. She made regular voyages to the Perth, Western Australia and Melbourne, Victoria. In 1852 she was sold to Captain George Hall, William Paxton and Captain Henry Simpson (d. 26 April 1884), and in April 1853 transferred to Captain William Francis Jnr. She was wrecked at Port Elliot on 6 September 1856 during a gale, when the government moorings gave way. The crew escaped unharmed but two sailors died when they attempted to return to the vessel. The ship was not insured and Captain Francis was bankrupted.
 He was appointed Commander on 4 March 1819.
 In 1836, Commander Lipson was appointed by the Admiralty as Naval Officer for South Australia, by the Colonial Government as Harbour-Master at Port Adelaide and Administrator of Marine Affairs, and by the Hon. Commissioners of H.M. Customs as Collector for South Australia. He made several surveys of the South Australian coast for the Home Government.
 In 1840 he resigned the Customs position, but held the former two until 1855, when he was given rank as Post-Captain and retired on a life pension.  He was appointed Master of the Trinity House Board (later renamed Marine Board) in 1852, a post he resigned in 1854 to be controversially replaced by Capt. B. Douglas.
 Captain Lipson died on 25 October 1863 and was interred at West Terrace Cemetery.

Character
When Lipson was eulogised in the South Australian Register, remark was given to his character. It noted a "general urbanity and affability which at all times marked his conduct in his intercourse with persons of inferior rank in life. An old acquaintance, though he might be in humble garb, was to him an old friend, and was recognised as such wherever met, and many a time has his warm heart flushed his happy face on meeting a subordinate or tradesman busy about his ordinary duties. Open-hearted, candid, and outspoken himself, he sought and felt delight in association with similar minds, wherever he found them."

Family
Thomas Lipson married Elizabeth Emma Fooks (1791 – 30 May 1880) of Melcombe Regis on 30 July 1812. They travelled to South Australia on the "Cygnet" with six children:
 Emma (Mary Ann) Catherine Berry Lipson (1813 – 28 April 1876) married G. S. Kingston M.L.C. on 4 December 1856 (his third marriage, reported as her second though details of the first yet to hand)
 Berry James Lipson (1816–1872) was a minor public servant in the Colonial Secretary's office. Convicted of embezzlement in February 1851 he scandalised his esteemed family, being sentenced to six months imprisonment. Following his release he left South Australia on 1 October 1851 for Sydney aboard the brig Two Friends. A Mr. Lipson left Adelaide alone on the schooner "Amicus" in 1853.
 Mary Fooks Lipson (1821 - 20 January 1898) married on 19 January 1839 to Henry Inman (1816–1895), founder and first commander of the South Australia Police. The couple, who were to have ten children, returned to England in 1848, where for 36 years he was Anglican Rector of North Scarle parish.
 Eliza Anne Lipson (died 15 March 1845) married John Allan on 25 February 1840, farming at "Allanvale" in the Wimmera district of Victoria.
subject of book "First She Lived : the journey of Eliza Lipson Allan" by Rhonda Poholke 
 Thomas Hardy Lipson (1823 – 18 March 1862), an epileptic, was firstly a customs officer at Port Adelaide and then a farmer on the Light River near Kapunda.
 Louisa Lipson (1829 – 5 August 1918) married James Collins Hawker (ca.1821 – 15 May 1901) Comptroller of Customs, son of Admiral Edward Hawker and brother of G. C. Hawker, on 24 October 1850. Their last home was "Ashford" on Strangways Terrace, North Adelaide.

Legacy
A plaque at the wharf, Port Adelaide, is dedicated to him and many landmarks and geographical features were named in his honor. They include:
 Lipson Street in Port Adelaide
 Lipson Reach - a section of the Port River on the North Arm, Port Adelaide
Lipson Cove, which lies midway between Tumby Bay and Port Neill
 Lipson Island (and Lipson Island Conservation Park) - an inshore island adjacent to Lipson Cove
Lipson - a small inland township north of Port Lincoln
 Lipson's Breakwater - a natural rocky headland at Port Elliot
 Lipson's Island, Port Elliot
Street names with a possible connection are: Lipson Place in Port Lincoln, Lipson Avenue in Kadina, Lipson Road in Wallaroo and Lipson Grove in Hawthorn.

References

External links 
 

Australian public servants
Royal Navy officers
1863 deaths
Year of birth uncertain
English emigrants to colonial Australia
Burials at West Terrace Cemetery
History of Port Adelaide